Geula ( lit. Redemption) is a neighborhood in the center of Jerusalem, populated mainly by Haredi Jews. Geula is bordered by Zikhron Moshe and Mekor Baruch on the west, the Bukharim neighborhood on the north, Mea Shearim on the east and the Jerusalem city center on the south.

History

Geula was established in 1927–28. It was originally a mixed neighborhood of secular and religious Jews. The British consul to Jerusalem, James Finn, built his home in the area in 1855, employing Jewish labor. It was the third building constructed outside the walls of the Old City. 

Geula was developed by banker Avraham Chasidoff (founder of Israel Discount Bank) who named the main street after his eldest daughter, Geula.Interview with Geula  

Geula was named for the neighborhood's main street, Geula Street, now Malkhei Yisrael Street. Geula Street was the commercial center for various local communities such as Kerem Avraham, Yagiya Kapayim, Zikhron Moshe, Batei Horenstein, and the Achva neighborhood. Today these communities are collectively known as the Geula neighborhood.  Malkhei Yisrael Street is lined with dozens of small shops. The neighborhood is home to many yeshivas and synagogues.

Landmarks
Kikar HaShabbat is the main intersection. The Zion Blumenthal Orphanage, founded in 1900, and Camp Schneller – formerly the Schneller Orphanage, founded in 1860 – became part of Geula as the neighborhood expanded. The Gur yeshiva, with a beit midrash of 10,000 seats, is also in Geula. The neighborhood is also home to Kretshme, Jerusalem's first Haredi bar.

Notable residents
Ada Yonath

References

Further reading
 Goshen-Gottstein, Esther R.: Growing up in “Geula”: Socialization and family living in an ultra-Orthodox Jewish subculture. In: Israel Journal of Psychiatry and Related Sciences, Vol 21(1), 1984, 37–55.

External links
 Yaffi Spodek and Josh Tapper: Get Your Kosher Ice Cream: A New Parlor Draws Crowds and Critics, Journey to Jerusalem, 24 April 2010.

 

Neighbourhoods of Jerusalem
Orthodox Jewish communities in Jerusalem